Aleksandra Kotlyarova (born 10 October 1988, in Samarkand) is an Uzbekistani athlete specializing in the triple jump.

International competitions

Personal bests
Outdoor
Long Jump – 6.43 m (+1.7 m/s) (Tashkent 2011)
Triple Jump – 14.35 m (+1.4 m/s) (Tashkent 2011)

Indoor
Long Jump – 6.46 m (Krasnodar 2010)
Triple Jump – 14.09 m (Tashkent 2010)

References
 

1988 births
Living people
People from Samarkand
Uzbekistani female long jumpers
Uzbekistani female triple jumpers
Olympic athletes of Uzbekistan
Athletes (track and field) at the 2012 Summer Olympics
Asian Games medalists in athletics (track and field)
Athletes (track and field) at the 2010 Asian Games
Athletes (track and field) at the 2014 Asian Games
Asian Games silver medalists for Uzbekistan
Medalists at the 2014 Asian Games
21st-century Uzbekistani women